Big Ric was a short-lived rock and power pop band from Los Angeles, California. The band was formed in 1982 by lead singer Joel Porter. Keyboardist Kevin DiSimone previously did work on some of Barry Manilow's albums such as co-writing the song "Stay" from Manilow's album Here Comes the Night. Guitarist John Pondel also worked with Manilow as he played guitar on Manilow's album If I Should Love Again. The band would release one self-titled album in 1983. A single from the album, "Take Away" would chart at number 91 on the Billboard Hot 100 in late 1983. The band additionally released two more singles, "Diana" and "How Does She Do It" the latter of which was released as a promotional single. "Take Away" was also accompanied by a nighttime restaurant and telephone call spy and espionage mystery themed music video (along with scenes of the band playing in some sort of house on a small stage) which was played on MTV and later MTV2.

Charts

References

Musical groups from Los Angeles
Scotti Brothers Records artists
Musical groups established in 1982
Musical groups disestablished in 1983